The Mphe Thuto Primary School (Setswana: "The learning student") is located in Tsjaka, a small village in Eastern Namibia, close to Botswana. Almost 440 pupils from grade one to seven attend the Mphe Thuto Primary School.

References

External links
School website

Schools in Omaheke Region